Ramularia primulae is a fungal plant pathogen infecting Primula.

References

Fungal plant pathogens and diseases
Ornamental plant pathogens and diseases
primulae
Fungi described in 1878